Pilidium may refer to:
 , larva of nemertean worms
 Pilidium (fungus), a genus of funguses in the family Chaetomellaceae
 Pilidium, a genus of gastropods in the family Velutinidae, synonym of Piliscus